XCar: Experimental Racing is a video game developed by MediaTech West and published by Bethesda Softworks for DOS on August 22, 1997.

Development
Development on the game started as early as 1995. The game was originally set to release in January 1997 but the release date was pushed to mid August 1997. The game's director of development was Brent Erickson. The development took 8 full time team members.

The game used SciTech Software's Display Doctor Technology.

Reception

The game received average reviews. Next Generation said, "There are an awful lot of racing titles out there, nearly all aimed at enthusiasts of one particular circuit or class of car. XCar has no license to speak of, throwing out any sort of endorsement in favor of raw performance and[,] above all, speed. For players who just want to go fast, it delivers."

Dennis Lynda of Chicago Tribune said, "If you're a would-be mechanic you will love this complex and intricately detailed game, but others will find their heads spinning long after the tires stop." Bad Hare of GamePro said, "XCar requires a driver's precision and a mechanic's sensibility – in other words, it's perfect for serious fans of Papyrus' ultra-real racing sims. If you don't enjoy the details, steer clear – this one ain't for casual Sunday drivers."

Notes

References

External links

1997 video games
Bethesda Softworks games
DOS games
DOS-only games
First-person video games
Racing video games
Video games developed in the United States
XnGine games